Amanda MacKinnon Gaiman Palmer (born April 30, 1976) is an American singer, songwriter, musician, and performance artist who is the lead vocalist, pianist, and lyricist of the duo The Dresden Dolls. She performs as a solo artist and was also a member of the duo Evelyn Evelyn, and the lead singer and songwriter of Amanda Palmer and the Grand Theft Orchestra. She has gained a cult fanbase throughout her career, and was one of the first musical artists to popularise the use of crowdfunding websites.

Early life
Palmer was born Amanda MacKinnon Palmer in New York City's Mount Sinai Hospital, and grew up in Lexington, Massachusetts. Her parents divorced when she was one year old, and as a child she rarely saw her father.

She attended Lexington High School, where she was involved in the drama department, and later attended Wesleyan University where she studied theater and was a member of the Eclectic Society. In 1999, Palmer founded the Shadowbox Collective, a performance group devoted to street theatre and putting on theatrical shows (such as the 2002 play, Hotel Blanc, which she directed).

Palmer briefly studied under Marcel Marceau in 2000.

Palmer graduated from Wesleyan University with a BA in 1998. Palmer then spent several years busking as a living statue called "The Eight Foot Bride" in Harvard Square, Cambridge, Massachusetts; Edinburgh, Scotland; Berlin, Germany and Melbourne, Australia (where she met future collaborator Jason Webley); and many other locations. She refers to her street performance work in The Dresden Dolls song "The Perfect Fit", as well as on the A is for Accident track "Glass Slipper".

Career

2000–2007: The Dresden Dolls and The Onion Cellar

At a Halloween party in 2000, Palmer met drummer Brian Viglione and afterwards they formed The Dresden Dolls. In an effort to expand the performance experience and interactivity, Palmer began inviting Lexington High School students to perform drama pieces at the Dresden Dolls' live shows. This evolved to The Dirty Business Brigade, a troupe of seasoned and new artists, performing at many gigs.

In 2002, after developing a cult following, the band recorded their eponymous debut album, The Dresden Dolls, with producer Martin Bisi. They produced the album before signing with the label Roadrunner Records.

In 2006, The Dresden Dolls Companion was published, with words, music and artwork by Amanda Palmer. In it she has written a history of the album The Dresden Dolls and of the duo, as well as a partial autobiography. The book also contains the lyrics, sheet music, and notes on each song in the album, all written by Palmer, as well as a DVD with a 20-minute interview of Amanda about making the book.

Palmer conceived the musical/production The Onion Cellar, based on a short story from The Tin Drum by Günter Grass. From December 9, 2006, through January 13, 2007, The Dresden Dolls performed the piece in conjunction with the American Repertory Theater at the Zero Arrow Theatre in Cambridge, Massachusetts. While Palmer was openly frustrated with the direction of the show, fan and critical reviews were very positive.

In June 2007, as part of the Dresden Dolls, she toured with the True Colors Tour 2007, including her debut in New York City's Radio City Music Hall, and her first review in The New York Times.

Though the Dresden Dolls broke up in 2008, Palmer and Viglione have continued to collaborate, and have had several minor reunions under the band name in 2011, 2012, 2016, 2017, and 2018.

2007–2010: Who Killed Amanda Palmer, Evelyn Evelyn, and theatrical work

In July 2007, Palmer played three sold-out shows (in Boston, Hoboken, and NYC) in a new "with band" format. Her backing band was Boston alternative rock group Aberdeen City, who also opened along with Dixie Dirt. In August 2007, Palmer traveled to perform in the Spiegeltent and other venues at the Edinburgh Festival Fringe in Scotland, and also performed on BBC Two's The Edinburgh Show. She collaborated with Australian theater company The Danger Ensemble; both again appeared at the Spiegeltent in Melbourne and at other venues around Australia in December 2007.

In September 2007, Palmer collaborated with Jason Webley to launch the new project Evelyn Evelyn with the EP Elephant Elephant. In the project, the duo play conjoined twin sisters named Eva and Lyn, and through their music tell their fictional backstory.

In July 2008, the Dresden Dolls released a second book, the Virginia Companion, a follow-up to The Dresden Dolls Companion, featuring the music and lyrics from the Yes, Virginia...(2006) and No, Virginia... (2008) albums, produced by Sean Slade and Paul Kolderie.

In June 2008, Palmer established her solo career with two well-received performances with the Boston Pops.

Her first solo studio album, Who Killed Amanda Palmer, was released on September 16, 2008. Ben Folds produced and also played on the album. The title is a play on an expression used by fans during Twin Peaks original run, "Who killed Laura Palmer?" A companion book of photos of Palmer looking as if she were murdered was released in July 2009. Titled Who Killed Amanda Palmer a Collection of Photographic Evidence, it featured photography by Kyle Cassidy and stories by Neil Gaiman, as well as lyrics from the album.

In late 2008, she toured Europe with Jason Webley, Zoë Keating and The Danger Ensemble, performing songs mostly from her debut solo album. She did most of the shows with a broken foot she had sustained in Belfast, Northern Ireland when a car ran over her foot as she stepped out into a street. In April 2009, she played at the Coachella Valley Music and Arts Festival.

In 2009, Palmer went back to her alma mater, Lexington High School in Massachusetts, to collaborate with her old director and mentor Steven Bogart on a workshop piece for the department's spring production. The play, With The Needle That Sings In Her Heart, was inspired by Neutral Milk Hotel's album In the Aeroplane Over the Sea and The Diary of Anne Frank. NPR's Avishay Artsy interviewed the cast on All Things Considered.

In 2010 Palmer returned to the A.R.T. for a two-month run of Cabaret, starring as the Emcee. The same year The Dresden Dolls reunited for a United States tour starting on Halloween in New York City and ending in San Francisco on New Year's Eve. 
On March 30, 2010 Palmer and Webley released their debut self-titled album as Evelyn Evelyn. This was accompanied by a worldwide tour and graphic novel based on the story of the sisters.

Palmer began using the ukulele during a concert as a goof, but soon it became a regular part of her repertoire. Later, she recorded a full album with ukulele accompaniment: Amanda Palmer Performs the Popular Hits of Radiohead on Her Magical Ukulele.

2012–2014:Theatre Is Evil and The Art of Asking
On April 20, 2012, Palmer announced on her blog that she launched a new album pre-order on Kickstarter. The Kickstarter project was ultimately supported by 24,883 backers for a grand total of $1,192,793 — at the time, the most funds ever raised for a musical project on Kickstarter. A widely reported and commented upon controversy emerged from the related tour when Palmer blogged asking for "semi-professional" local musicians (fans who were already planning on attending various stops on the tour) to volunteer to play a couple of songs with her and her band, The Grand Theft Orchestra, during their live shows for "exposure, fun, beer and hugs" instead of money. After outcry from various music unions and professional musicians, Palmer responded publicly and changed her policy to one of paying local musicians cash (in addition to the aforementioned fun, beer and hugs). The album, Theatre Is Evil, was recorded with The Grand Theft Orchestra, produced by John Congleton, and released in September 2012. On November 9, 2012, Palmer released the music video for "Do it With a Rockstar" on The Flaming Lips' website. The video was co-created and directed by Wayne Coyne, lead singer of The Flaming Lips. Subsequent videos were released for "The Killing Type" and "The Bed Song".

On August 9, 2013, Palmer made her Lincoln Center debut.

In November 2014, Palmer released her memoir, The Art of Asking, which expands on a TED talk she gave in February 2013. The book made the New York Times Best Seller list. The book also received several critical reviews, most notably from NPR.

2015–2018: You Got Me Singing, I Can Spin a Rainbow, and Patreon
On March 3, 2015, Amanda began soliciting financial support on the crowdfunding platform Patreon.
Palmer spoke at the 2015 Hay Festival about the prospect of reconciling art and motherhood. The talk was recorded for the BBC Radio 4 series Four Thought and broadcast on June 21, 2015. Also in 2015, she served as a judge for The 14th Annual Independent Music Awards. During the first months of 2016, she released the completely Patreon-funded song "Machete", and a David Bowie tribute EP, entitled Strung Out In Heaven: A Bowie String Quartet Tribute. 
Amanda Palmer collaborated with her father, Jack Palmer, to record an album entitled You Got Me Singing. They performed concerts in July 2016 in support of the album.

Amanda Palmer collaborated with Legendary Pink Dots frontman Edward Ka-Spel to record an album, I Can Spin a Rainbow. The duo toured in May and June 2017 in support of the album, backed by Legendary Pink Dots' former violin player Patrick Q. Wright.

2019–present: There Will Be No Intermission and podcast
On March 8, 2019, Palmer released her third solo studio album and first in seven years, There Will Be No Intermission. The album was promoted by an extensive world tour that was filmed for her patrons on Patreon.

In fall 2020, Palmer launched a podcast called The Art of Asking Everything. On October 31, 2020, Palmer and Viglione performed "Science Fiction/Double Feature" to open the Wisconsin Democrats Livestream fundraiser that reunited some original Rocky Horror Picture Show cast members to act out the show with additional stars and singers.

Personal life

Palmer lived for more than a decade in an independent artists cooperative named The Cloud Club in Boston, Massachusetts.

Palmer is bisexual, telling afterellen.com in 2007: "I'm bisexual, but it's not the sort of thing I spent a lot of time thinking about," Palmer said. "I've slept with girls; I've slept with guys, so I guess that's what they call it! I'm not anti trying to use language to simplify our lives." Palmer has spoken out on feminist issues and about her open relationships, stating in one interview that "I've never been comfortable in a monogamous relationship in my life. I feel like I was built for open relationships just because of the way I function. It's not a reactive decision like, 'Hey I'm on the road, you're on the road, let's just find other people.' It was a fundamental building block of our relationship. We both like things this way."

Palmer has said that she once worked as a stripper under the name Berlin. She has stated that the song "Berlin" was written about this experience.

Palmer has had three abortions, and her song "Voicemail for Jill" is about these experiences.

Palmer and author Neil Gaiman confirmed their engagement in 2010. The couple married in a private ceremony in January 2011. The wedding took place in the parlor of writers Ayelet Waldman and Michael Chabon. They have a son, Anthony "Ash", born on September 16, 2015, named for Palmer's close friend and mentor (and childhood next-door neighbor), the author and psychotherapist Dr. C. Anthony Martignetti, who died on June 22, 2015.

In March 2020, Palmer was on the final leg of her international tour in support of her latest album, There Will Be No Intermission, when countries started grounding flights and locking down borders due to the COVID-19 pandemic. Palmer, Gaiman, and their son were in Havelock North, Hawke's Bay when on 25 March 2020, New Zealand's government announced that the whole country would move to COVID-19 Alert Level 4: complete lockdown and quarantining of people within their own homes. In May 2020, Gaiman traveled from New Zealand to his holiday home on the Isle of Skye, breaking lockdown rules imposed during the COVID-19 pandemic. Ross, Skye and Lochaber MP Ian Blackford described his behaviour as unacceptable and dangerous. Gaiman published an apology on his website, saying he had endangered the local community. After Gaiman's departure, Palmer announced on her Patreon that she and Gaiman had separated and requested privacy. Gaiman stated in a blog post that their split was "my fault, I'm afraid" and also requesting privacy. The couple later released a joint statement clarifying that they were not, however, getting divorced. They reconciled in 2021.  In November 2022, Palmer and Gaiman announced in a joint statement that they were going to divorce.

Palmer practices yoga and meditation and wrote an article titled "Melody vs. Meditation" for the Buddhist publication Shambhala Sun (now known as 'Lion's Roar'), which described the struggle between songwriting and being able to clear the mind to meditate.

Awards and honors
 2012: Artist & Manager Awards - Pioneer Award
 2012: Twitter Feed @amandapalmer in the Boston Phoenixs Best 2012
 2011: Actress in a local production: Cabaret – Boston's Best, Improper Bostonian
 2010: Artist of the Year – Boston Music Awards
 2010: Cover of "Fake Plastic Trees" (Radiohead) named 13th of Paste magazine's 20 Best Cover Songs of 2010
 2009: No. 100 on After Ellen's Hot 100 of 2009.
 2008: No. 6 on the Best Solo artist list in The Guardians Readers' Poll of 2008.
 2007: No. 6 on Spinner.com's "Women Who Rock Right Now".
 2006: The Boston Globe named her the most stylish woman in Boston.
 2006: Listed in Blender magazine's hottest women of rock.
 2005: Best Female Vocalist in the WFNX/Boston Phoenix Best Music Poll.

Discography

Solo studio albums
 Who Killed Amanda Palmer (2008)
 Theatre Is Evil (2012) (with The Grand Theft Orchestra)
 There Will Be No Intermission (2019)

Collaborative studio albums
 You Got Me Singing (2016) (with Jack Palmer)
 I Can Spin a Rainbow (2017) (with Edward Ka-Spel)
 Forty-Five Degrees - A Bushfire Charity Flash Record (2020) (with various artists)

Other albums
 Amanda Palmer Performs the Popular Hits of Radiohead on Her Magical Ukulele (2010)
 Amanda Palmer Goes Down Under (2011)
 An Evening With Neil Gaiman & Amanda Palmer (2013) (with Neil Gaiman)
 Piano Is Evil (2016)

Tours
 True Colors Tour (2007)
Who Killed Amanda Palmer Tour (2008–2009)
Amanda Palmer: Live in Australia (2010)
Evelyn Evelyn Tour (2010)
Dresden Dolls 10th Anniversary Tour (2010–2011)
Amanda Palmer & The Grand Theft Orchestra: Theatre Is Evil Tour (2012)
An Evening with Neil Gaiman & Amanda Palmer (2013)
The Music of David Byrne & The Talking Heads (2014–2015)
An Evening with Amanda Fucking Palmer (2015)
The Art of Asking Book Tour (2015)
You Got Me Singing Tour (with Jack Palmer) (2016)
I Can Spin a Rainbow Tour (with Edward Ka-Spel) (2017)
Dresden Dolls Reunion Tour (2017–2018)
There Will Be No Intermission World Tour (2019–2020)
An Evening with Amanda Palmer: New Zealand Tour (2020)

Filmography

Podcasts

The Art of Asking Everything
In fall 2020, Palmer announced she would be releasing a podcast called The Art of Asking Everything.

Other

Bibliography
Some of the books written in full, or collaboratively, by Amanda Palmer:

 
 
 
 
 
 

Palmer also has a chapter giving advice in Tim Ferriss' book Tools of Titans.

See also

 List of TED speakers

References

External links

 Amanda Palmer's official site
 
 
 

1976 births
Living people
Alternative rock pianists
Alternative rock singers
American alternative rock musicians
American bloggers
American street performers
American women rock singers
American feminists
American people of Scottish descent
American rock pianists
American women pianists
American ukulele players
American women dramatists and playwrights
American women performance artists
American performance artists
Bisexual feminists
Bisexual singers
Bisexual songwriters
Bisexual dramatists and playwrights
Bisexual women
Dark cabaret musicians
Evelyn Evelyn members
Women punk rock singers
Feminist musicians
LGBT people from Massachusetts
LGBT people from New York (state)
American LGBT rights activists
American LGBT singers
American LGBT songwriters
American LGBT dramatists and playwrights
Neil Gaiman
Musicians from Boston
People from Lexington, Massachusetts
Singers from Massachusetts
Songwriters from Massachusetts
The Dresden Dolls members
Wesleyan University alumni
American women bloggers
Lexington High School alumni
20th-century American women singers
21st-century American women singers
Roadrunner Records artists
Cooking Vinyl artists
8in8 members
Patreon creators
20th-century LGBT people
21st-century LGBT people